Connor Brown may refer to:

Connor Brown (cricketer) (born 1997), Welsh cricketer
Connor Brown (cyclist) (born 1998), New Zealand cyclist
Connor Brown (footballer) (born 1991), English footballer
Connor Brown (ice hockey) (born 1994), Canadian ice hockey player